The triceps surae consists of two muscles located at the calf – the two-headed gastrocnemius and the soleus.  These muscles both insert into the calcaneus, the bone of the heel of the human foot, and form the major part of the muscle of the posterior leg, commonly known as the calf muscle.

Structure 
The triceps surae is connected to the foot through the Achilles tendon, and has 3 heads deriving from the 2 major masses of muscle.

 The superficial portion (the gastrocnemius) gives off 2 heads attaching to the base of the femur directly above the knee.
 The deep (profundus) mass of muscle (the soleus) forms the remaining head which attaches to the superior posterior area of the tibia.
The triceps surae is innervated by the tibial nerve, specifically, nerve roots L5–S2.

Function 
Contraction of the triceps surae induce plantar flexion (sagittal plane) and stabilization of the ankle complex in the transverse plane.  Functional activities include primarily movement in the sagittal plane, stabilization during locomotion (walking, running), restraining the body from falling and power jumping. By controlling the disequilibrium torque, the triceps surae can affect force through the exchange of potential into kinetic energy.

Clinical significance

Calf strain (torn calf muscle) 
A calf strain refers to damage to a muscle or its attaching tendons.  A premature return before recovery is achieved will result in a prolonged recovery or incomplete return to baseline prior to injury. Stretches such as alternating calf raises can improve flexibility as well as mobilize legs before running.

Calf muscles are a common place for fasciculations.

Additional images

Etymology and pronunciation
The term is pronounced . It is from Latin caput and sura meaning "three-headed [muscle] of the calf".

References

Further reading 

 

Calf muscles
Muscles of the lower limb